The ABC islands or ABC Islands is a colloquial name for one of the following two archipelagos:

 ABC Islands (Alaska), comprising Admiralty Island, Baranof Island, and Chichagof Island
 ABC islands (Leeward Antilles), comprising the Dutch Caribbean islands of Aruba, Bonaire, and Curaçao